Marit Bouwmeester (born 17 June 1988 Wartena) is a sailor from the Netherlands.

Bouwmeester won the gold medal in the Laser Radial class in the 2016 Summer Olympics in Rio de Janeiro, and the silver medal at the 2012 Summer Olympics in Weymouth. In 2017, she won the World Sailor of the Year Award. She competed at the 2020 Summer Olympics in Tokyo 2021, competing in Laser Radial.

References

External links
 
 
 
 

Dutch female sailors (sport)
Living people
1988 births
People from Boarnsterhim
Sportspeople from Friesland
Sailors at the 2012 Summer Olympics – Laser Radial
Sailors at the 2016 Summer Olympics – Laser Radial
Sailors at the 2020 Summer Olympics – Laser Radial
Olympic sailors of the Netherlands
Medalists at the 2012 Summer Olympics
Medalists at the 2016 Summer Olympics
Medalists at the 2020 Summer Olympics
Olympic medalists in sailing
Olympic gold medalists for the Netherlands
Olympic silver medalists for the Netherlands
Olympic bronze medalists for the Netherlands
Knights of the Order of Orange-Nassau
21st-century Dutch women
20th-century Dutch women